Kohrt is a surname of North German origin. Notable people with the surname include:

Niklas Kohrt (born 1980), German actor
Ruth Davis Kohrt (1921–2012), American author

References

Surnames of German origin